Radio Srbac or Радио Србац is a Bosnian local public radio station, broadcasting from Srbac, Bosnia and Herzegovina.

It was launched in 1974 by the municipal council of Srbac. In Yugoslavia and in SR Bosnia and Herzegovina, it was part of local/municipal Radio Sarajevo network affiliate. This radio station broadcasts a variety of programs such as local news, music, sport and talk shows. Program is mainly produced in Serbian language.

Estimated number of listeners of Radio Srbac is around 15.707. Radiostation is also available in neighboring Croatia.

Frequencies 
 Srbac

See also 
List of radio stations in Bosnia and Herzegovina
Radio Gradiška
Radio Kostajnica

References

External links 
 www.radiosrbac.com
 www.fmscan.org
 Communications Regulatory Agency of Bosnia and Herzegovina

Srbac
Radio stations established in 1974